The Great Fire of 1805 occurred on , in the city of Detroit, in the Michigan Territory of the United States.  The fire destroyed almost everything in the city.

The motto of the city, Speramus meliora; resurget cineribus ('We hope for better things; it will rise from the ashes'), was written after this fire.

References 

1805 fires in the United States
1805 in Detroit
Fires in Michigan
Urban fires in the United States